Stefan Nguyen (born 24 February 1992) is a retired Vietnamese-Swedish professional basketball player for the Hanoi Buffaloes of the VBA and Saigon Heat of the ABL. He is a VBA champion 2016 with Da Nang Dragons. He is a member of the Vietnamese Men's National Team and represented them last in the SEA GAMES 30 in the Philippines. Stefan holds two passports. Swedish and Vietnamese. His parents are Vietnamese immigrants.

Early career
Stefan was born in a small town city of Ängelholm in southern Sweden. Raised by his parents always speaking Vietnamese at home, he is today fluent speaking in it. Prior playing professionally in Vietnam, he was a member of the top basketball high school Luleå Riksbasket Gymnasium and also selected to play for the Swedish junior national team program from age of Under 15 to Under 20. During his youth years and being considered one of the best Swedish talents he played against several NBA players of today such as Jonas Valanciunas, Enes Kanter, Dario Saric, Rudy Gobert and more.

Pro career
After finishing up Highschool at the age of 18. He decided to go pro with 08 Stockholm. 2 years with 08 led to a move to Malbas Basket where he would be the key player to lead his team to the SBL in Sweden. After that successful season Stefan looked to play overseas and got in touch with Saigon Heat. Nguyen signed with the Saigon Heat prior to the 2015-16 ASEAN Basketball League.<ref>

Coaching career
After retiring from professional basketball in 2020, he turned his attention to coaching full-time. He founded Next Level Basketball in 2018. He also serves as an assistant coach for the Danang Dragons of the VBA.

VBA statistics

|-
| style="text-align:left;"| 2016
| style="text-align:left;"| Danang
| 20 || 19 || 33 || .390 || .200 || .570 || 4.6 || 4.2 || 1.1 || .1 || 13.7
|- class"sortbottom"
| style="text-align:left;"| 2018
| style="text-align:left;"| Hanoi Buffaloes
| 17 || 17 || 32 || .440 || .310 || .620 || 4.4 || 2.5 || 1.7 || .1 || 15.2
|- class"sortbottom"
| style="text-align:left;"| 2019
| style="text-align:left;"| Hanoi Buffaloes
| 7 || 7 || 31 || .370 || .150 || .600 || 4 || 2.7 || 1.9 || .1 || 15.6
|- class"sortbottom"
| style="text-align:center;" colspan="2"| Career
| 44 || 43 || 32 || .400 || .220 || .600 || 4.3 || 3.1 || 1.6 || .1 || 14.8

References

External links
 Career statistics and player information from ASEANBasketballLeague.com

1992 births
Living people
Competitors at the 2019 Southeast Asian Games
Point guards
Saigon Heat players
Southeast Asian Games bronze medalists for Vietnam
Southeast Asian Games medalists in basketball
Sportspeople of Vietnamese descent
Swedish men's basketball players
Swedish people of Vietnamese descent
Vietnamese basketball players
People from Ängelholm Municipality